PayMate is a business-to-business (B2B) digital and financial services company headquartered in Mumbai.

History 
The company was launched in May 2006 as India's first mobile payments provider that allowed consumers to use their mobile phones to pay for online and retail purchases, make utility bill payments, purchase tickets, etc. via their bank account, credit card or a prepaid account. The PayPOS application, that allowed small businesses to accept credit and debit cards and process electronic transactions directly on their mobile phones at the point of sale devices (POS), was also launched, shaping up the company's B2C offerings and disrupting the Indian payment landscape.

A person-to-person (P2P) mobile money transfer facility was also offered in association with Tata Indicom and Corporation Bank launched Green Money Transfer.

In 2013, PayMate began focusing on B2B payments that automated payables and receivables, and was processing in excess of $500M in annualized payment processing run rate.

In due course, this business payments platform evolved, making the company a strategic B2B partner for Visa in 2018. This partnership flourished and led to PayMate's expansion into CEMEA region to offer its business payments platform.

As there was no more requirement of the wallet license, in February 2017, the company gave up its RBI issued prepaid wallet license, discontinuing all its B2C payments activity and focus only on B2B payments opportunities across geographies.

PayMate India Lts. filed its  Draft Red Herring Prospectus (DRHP) with capital markets regulator Sebi to float its initial public offering (IPO) in May, 2022.

Acquisition 
PayMate acquired lender Zaitech Technologies Pvt. Ltd in 2018.

Awards and recognition 

 2018: Finalist at Citi India Fintech Challenge
 2021: BT-KPMG Best Bank and Fintech Jury Award for Best Fintech
 2020: BT-KPMG Best Bank and Fintech Jury Award for Best Fintech

References

Further reading 
"PayMate Pivoting To B2B Platform", Techcircle, 26 November 2014
"Cosmos Bank partners with PayMate for mobile payment solutions", Economic Times, 23 January 2008
"MyGiftMate: Gift the SMS Way", SiliconIndia, August 2008
"PayMate Founder Ajay Adiseshann on E-Commerce via SMS", Pod Tech, 2 May 2007

Mobile payments in India
Companies based in Mumbai
Financial services companies established in 2006
2006 establishments in Maharashtra
Indian companies established in 2006
Cloud platforms
Credit cards